Vanessa Henke (born 15 January 1981), also known as Vanessa Paffrath, is a German former professional tennis player.

In her career, she won six singles titles and ten doubles titles on the ITF Women's Circuit. Her best singles ranking was world No. 137, achieved on 26 September 2005. On 8 July 2002, she peaked at No. 110 in the WTA doubles rankings.

Career
Henke took part in the qualifying for the 2006 Qatar Ladies Open, but lost in the second round. She also participated at the 2007 Bank of the West Classic and many other ITF & WTA Tour events.

In 2003, she played one match for the Germany Fed Cup team. Alongside Angelika Rösch she lost in the World Group Play-offs against the pairing of Indonesian team in straight sets (overall Germany won 3–2).

WTA career finals

Doubles: 2 (2 runner-ups)

ITF finals

Singles: 8 (6–2)

Doubles: 19 (10–9)

External links
 
 
 

1981 births
Living people
German female tennis players